National Secondary Route 245, or just Route 245 (or ) is a National Road Route of Costa Rica, located in the Puntarenas province.

Description
In Puntarenas province the route covers Osa canton (Sierpe, Piedras Blancas districts), Golfito canton (Puerto Jiménez district).

References

Highways in Costa Rica